The Arcadia Players is an American chamber orchestra using historically informed performance to explore repertoire from the Renaissance, Baroque, and Classical eras. Based in Northampton, Massachusetts, the ensemble performs throughout New England.

Background

Founded in 1989 by Margaret Irwin-Brandon, the Arcadia Players holds a residency at the Massachusetts Center for Renaissance Studies at UMass Amherst. The ensemble’s website states they “embrace historical performance practice to illuminate and invigorate the great Western heritage of vocal and instrumental music.”

In 2006, the Arcadia Players released an album with Jaap Schröder, titled Trio Sonatas. The ensemble partnered with The Shakespeare Concerts for several years, releasing three projects through Navona Records.

The Arcadia Players has collaborated with several institutions throughout New England, including the Connecticut Early Music Festival, Dartmouth College, the Hartt School, Mount Holyoke College, Smith College, and Yale University. Longtime artistic director, Ian Watson, stepped down in 2019.

To open the ensemble's 30th Anniversary Season, Margaret Irwin-Brandon (Director Emerita) performed a program at Mount Holyoke College's Abbey Chapel. Woodrow Bynum led another program with the Choir of Men and Boys from Cathedral of All Saints (Albany, New York). The COVID-19 pandemic has limited operations, including the ensemble’s search for a new artistic director.

Discography

 2006: Trio Sonatas
 2014: Joseph Summer: Goddesses (Shakespeare Concerts Series, Vol. 3)
 2015: Joseph Summer: Full Fathom Five - Music on Shakespeare's 'The Tempest' (Shakespeare Concert Series, Vol. 5)
 2018: Joseph Summer: No Enemy but Winter and Rough Weather (Shakespeare Concerts Series, Vol. 6)

References

Historically informed performance
Early music groups
1989 establishments in Massachusetts
Northampton, Massachusetts
Musical groups from Massachusetts